Banki Mongra is a region in the city of Korba in the central Indian state of Chhattisgarh. The region is known for its underground coal mines.

, Banki Mongra has three active mines: the number 3-4 mine, the number 5-6 mine and the number 9-10 mine. Other mines are no longer active. Banki Main Mine and the Surakachhar 5&6 Inclines are the only coal-producing mines at Banki Mongra and Surakachhar. The Main Mine and Surakachhar 3&4 Inclines are in the Surakachhar-Balgi Sub Area which is located on the road connecting Banki – Mongra to Korba Headquarters.

Education

Higher secondary schools 
 Saraswati Higher Secondary School, Banki Mongra
 Gyanoday Hr. Sec. School Jangal Side, Banki Mongra.
 Jagruti Hr. Sec. School, Bandha para, Banki Mongra.
 Sarwamangla vidya mandir higher secondary school pankha dafai Banki mongra

High schools 
 Sunshine High School Banki Mongra.

Middle Schools 
 MJV English Medium School Banki Mongra
 Government Middle School Banki Side
 Ghordewa School
 Pronnat Middle School Banki side

Primary Schools 
 Beacon English School Gajra
 Saraswati Shishu Mandir Banki Mongra
 Lal bahadur school Katainar
 Aatim jatim kalyanay vidyalay prathmic sala banki side
 Vande maatram school gajra Banki mongra

Transport 

The township is well connected to Bilaspur, Raipur and Ambikapur via road. The nearest Railway station is Gevra Road Korba. The Korba airstrip is 12 km from Banki Mongra.

Administration 
Banki Mongra comes under the municipal corporation of Korba and Banki Mongra Zone serving ward numbers 55,56,57,58,59,60,61,62,63,64,65,66 and 67. The Postal Index Number (PIN) of the area is 495447.

Demographics 
The population is about 118,000.

Culture 

The local Hindu festivals Navaratri and Dashehra are celebrated.

Hospitals 
 SECL Hospital
 New Korba Hospital
 Balaji Superspeciality Trauma & Care Hospital
 Krishna Hospital
 Primary Health Centre Mongra
 Sub Health Centre Katainaar (Banki)
 Sub Health Centre,Kudhripara (Banki)
Sub Health Centre, Ghurdeva (Banki)

References 

https://indiamapia.com/Korba/Banki_Mongra.html

Cities and towns in Korba district